Matt McGillivray (born 28 August 1990) is a South African first-class cricketer. He was included in the Highveld Lions squad for the 2016–17 Sunfoil Series.

References

External links
 

1990 births
Living people
South African cricketers
Gauteng cricketers
Lions cricketers
Cricketers from Johannesburg